The National Shrine and Parish of Saint Padre Pio (Filipino: Pambansang Dambana at Parokya ni Santo Padre Pio), commonly known as Padre Pio Shrine, is a parish church and pilgrimage site situated along Governor Antonio Carpio Avenue (Santo Tomas–Lipa Road) in Barangay San Pedro, Santo Tomas, Batangas, Philippines. It is consecrated to the Italian Saint Pio of Pietrelcina.

Administered by the Roman Catholic Archdiocese of Lipa, the church was designated a national shrine by the Catholic Bishops' Conference of the Philippines, making it the first in the province of Batangas and in the Calabarzon region. It became one of the venues for the 4th World Apostolic Congress of Mercy held in the Philippines on 16–20 January 2017.

Architecture

The structure of the main church is made mostly of indigenous materials such as wood, stone, bamboo, sasa or nipa leaves and sawali or woven bamboo strips. The shape of its roof resembles a salakot, a traditional Filipino hat used by farmers and fishermen in their respective agricultural activities as their protection against the heat and rain. At the top of the roof stands the image of Our Lady of Mercy. The structure is open so that the pilgrims can enter and exit freely.

Inside the main church hangs a huge replica of the Glorious Cross derived from the design used for the Archdiocese of Lipa during the Jubilee Year 2000. The cross at the crucifix, the bottom of the altar table and the lectern are made of drift wood to adapt to the design of the main church. At the back is the Blessed Sacrament Chapel and its underneath is the Baptistery.

The rector and parish priest Joselin C. Gonda envisioned this concept for the main church, to have a place of worship and prayer that is distinctly Filipiniana, eco-friendly and adapted to the tropical climate of the site surrounded by a very green environment, making it a unique, serene and welcoming atmosphere drawing pilgrims to pray, to reflect and to be inspired by God and the nature God created.

Similar designs aside from the main church can also be seen in the Mary Mother of Mercy Belfry, the St. John Mary Vianney Chapel of Reconciliation, the Sanctuary of the True Cross of Christ, and the Holy Water Sanctuary.

Other structures built within the national shrine include the parish rectory, office and religious store, the Fountain of Hope, the Stations of the Cross, and recently the Divine Mercy Sanctuary for Pilgrims.

History
Padre Pio Shrine began as a small chapel along Maharlika Highway in Barangay San Pedro. The 10 barangays comprising the proposed parish were under the pastoral care of the St. Thomas Aquinas Parish in the poblacion of Santo Tomas, Batangas. Months after the canonization of St. Padre Pio in 2002, the first of his first-class relics was entrusted to the proposed parish by Rev. Fr. Cesar Acuin, OFMCap.

On 28 June 2003, the Parish of St. Padre Pio of Pietrelcina was canonically erected by Lipa Archbishop Gaudencio Rosales, D.D. It is the first parish in the Philippines under the patronage of the Capuchin saint. Dale Anthony Q. Barretto-Ko was installed as its first pastor.

Due to the growing number of devotees and parishioners from nearby barangays and towns that the chapel could not accommodate, a  agricultural land also in Barangay San Pedro almost a kilometer away from Maharlika Highway was donated to the Archdiocese of Lipa by a generous couple, Ernesto and Adelaida Gonzaga, where a new and larger church would be built. Dr. Isabel Malvar-Villegas donated a  parcel of land that would be used as a right of way from the barangay road leading to the site. Groundbreaking ceremonies took place in 2006 and a temporary chapel of nipa leaves and bamboo was built at the new site.

On 23 December 2008, Lipa Archbishop Ramon Arguelles elevated the parish church as the Archdiocesan Shrine of St. Padre Pio. A year later, Joselin C. Gonda has been appointed to take over the administration of the parish and the construction of the church at the new site.

While the construction of the main church was ongoing, the shrine was named as one of the pilgrimage churches for the Centennial Jubilee of the establishment of the See of Lipa. Other designated pilgrimage churches were San Sebastian Cathedral, Carmelite Monastery, Redemptorist Church and the Archdiocesan Shrine of San Vicente Ferrer in Lipa City, Basilica of the Immaculate Conception and the Most Holy Trinity Parish in Batangas City and Basilica of St. Martin of Tours and the Archdiocesan Shrine of Our Lady of Caysasay in Taal.

On 23 September 2013, the feast day of St. Padre Pio of Pietrelcina, the main parish church was solemnly dedicated to God by Gaudencio Cardinal Rosales, D.D. Present at the dedication was Ermelindo di Capua, OFMCap, the only surviving Italian Capuchin priest who worked closely with and took care of St. Padre Pio for three years before the saint's death. Father di Capua (d. 22 February 2017) also entrusted two first-class relics of the saint to the national shrine in 2010.

The Catholic Bishops' Conference of the Philippines (CBCP), on their semi-annual plenary assembly in 2015, unanimously approved the elevation of the Archdiocesan Shrine of St. Padre Pio into a national shrine. On 14 September 2015, marking the first day of novena to St. Padre Pio, the president of the CBCP and Lingayen-Dagupan archbishop, Socrates Villegas, D.D., led the solemn declaration of the national shrine.

On 18 January 2017, the 4th World Apostolic Congress on Mercy in the Philippines, attended by thousands of participants and pilgrims from all over the country and other parts of the world, had its third day at the national shrine. This Divine Mercy Sanctuary for Pilgrims, where the day's activities were held, had been solemnly dedicated on 23 December 2016.

Devotion to St. Padre Pio

Aside from the regular Sunday and daily Masses, devotees and parishioners flock to the national shrine for a special day of prayer to St. Padre Pio every 23rd of the month except in the month of May when it is held on the saint’s birthday, 25 May. Additional special days of prayer are held every 1st and 3rd Saturdays of the month.

Healing liturgy follows after Mass at 9:00 in the morning and 5:00 in the afternoon. After reading the Gospel followed by a brief homily, prayer for healing of the sick comes when first- and second-class relics of St. Padre Pio are exposed to be venerated by the pilgrims. Then there is an anointing with Oil of the Sick by the priests and religious present.

Flowers are offered at the image of St. Padre Pio before the end of the Mass. One can either offer white or red roses or both. It is said that a woman named Vittoria had a vision of luminous rays formed by thousands of white and red roses that radiated out from St. Padre Pio and spread in every direction. She sought an explanation from the saint, and he told the woman that the white roses in her vision represent the souls who attempt to live in grace, in love of God and in fraternal charity, while the red roses represent those who carry the cross of suffering with joy, and united with Jesus collaborate in the conversion of sinners and in the salvation of others.

Novena booklets, images and other religious items are available at the shrine’s store separated from the main church.

Gallery

References

See also 
 Padre Pio of Pietrelcina

Roman Catholic national shrines in the Philippines
Roman Catholic churches in Batangas
Churches completed in 2013
Churches in the Roman Catholic Archdiocese of Lipa